Je or JE may refer to:

Arts and entertainment
 JE (TV series), a Canadian television newsmagazine series on TVA
 Joy Electric, an analogue purist synthpop group

Businesses and organizations
 Johnny's Entertainment, a Japanese talent agency
 Jonathan Edwards College, a residential college at Yale University
 Junior enterprise, a local non-profit organization offering consulting services (managed by students)
 Mango, a South African airline (2006-2021, IATA code JE)

Language
 Je (Cyrillic), a character in several alphabets
 Jê languages, a language family of Brazil
 Yei language, or Je, a language of Papua New Guinea

People
 Je Tsongkhapa (1357–1419), Tibetan religious leader

Other uses
 JE, an intermediate source text postulated by the documentary hypothesis for the Torah
 Jahnke and Emde aka "Tables of Functions with Formulas and Curves", a mathematics book on special functions
 Japanese encephalitis, an infectious disease
 Jersey, an island in the English Channel (ISO 3166-1 alpha-2 country code JE)
 JE postcode area
 .je, the Internet country code top-level domain for Jersey
 Jê peoples of Brazil
 Jewish Encyclopedia
 Jōmon Era of prehistoric Japan
 Journal entry